Nkayi is a town and a commune in  the Bouenza Department of the Republic of the Congo.  It is the country's fourth largest city with a population of 71,620 (2007 census).

Nkayi is a major sugar production centre in the country.

Transport 

The city is served by a station on the national railway network, the Congo-Ocean Railway.  It is home to Yokangassi Airport, also known as Nkayi Airport.

History 

Situated in the fertile Niari Valley, the town was named Jacob in 1887. That was the name of the French engineer who led the first mission to select the best route for the Congo-Ocean Railway. Then the city  began growing thanks to the thriving sugar cane plantations led by important agroindustries. In 1975, Jacob had a population of 25,000, and its name was changed to the native one of Nkayi.

The city is the fourth largest town in the Republic of the Congo since 1980.

Since 2004, Nkayi has got the status of commune and is divided in two urban districts (arrondissements):
 Mouana Nto (Mouana Ntô)
 Soulouka

See also 

 Railway stations in Congo

References 

 Decalo S., Thompson V. & Adloff R. 1984. Historical dictionary of Congo Pg 218-219. USA: The Scarecrow Press, Inc

Bouenza Department
Communes of the Republic of the Congo
Populated places in the Republic of the Congo